The Lame is an epithet which may refer to:
Charles II of Naples (1254–1309), King of Naples, King of Albania, Prince of Salerno, Prince of Achaea, Count of Provence and Count of Anjou
Eric XI of Sweden (1216-1250), King of Sweden
Hermann of Reichenau (1013–1054), German scholar, composer, music theorist, mathematician and astronomer
Joan the Lame (1293–1348), Queen consort of France as the first wife of Philip VI
Joan, Duchess of Brittany (c. 1324–1384)
Lothair the Lame (c. 848–865), a son of Holy Roman Emperor Charles the Bald
Louis I, Duke of Bourbon (1279–1342), also Count of Clermont-en-Beauvaisis and La Marche
Otto IV, Duke of Brunswick-Lüneburg (died 1446), also Prince of Lüneburg
Peter the Lame, Prince of Moldavia (1574–1577, 1578–1579 and 1583–1591)
Sigobert the Lame (died c. 509), a king of the Franks
Timur the Lame (1336–1405), Turko-Mongol ruler better known as Tamurlane
Osman the Lame, (1883-1923), Ottoman officer, militia leader

Lists of people by epithet